This is a list of aviation-related events from 2007.

Deadliest crash
The deadliest crash of this year was TAM Airlines Flight 3054, a Airbus A320 which crashed in a runway overrun in São Paulo, Brazil on 17 July, killing all 187 people on board, as well as 12 on the ground.

Events

January
1 January
After its pilots became preoccupied with troubleshooting the inertial navigation system, inadvertently disconnect the autopilot, and lose control of the aircraft, Adam Air Flight 574, a Boeing 737-400, crashes into the Makassar Strait near Polewali in Sulawesi, Indonesia, killing all 102 people on board.
Caribbean Airlines begins operations, replacing BWIA West Indies Airways, which had shut down the previous day.
6 January – BA Connect, easyJet, XL Airways UK, Thomsonfly, Thomas Cook Airlines, Balkan Bulgarian Airlines, First Choice Airways, Air Malta, KLM Cityhopper and SN Brussels Airlines cancel all their flights to and from Bristol International Airport in North Somerset, England, in a row over runway safety.
9 January – An Antonov An-26B of AerianTur-M crashes while attempting to land at Balad Air Base in Balad, Iraq, killing 34 of the 35 people aboard. Officials blame the crash on fog, but some witness say that they saw a surface-to-air missile strike the aircraft, and the Islamic Army in Iraq claims to have shot it down.
16 January – Pakistan Air Force aircraft and Pakistan Army helicopter gunships strike Zamzola in South Waziristan, Pakistan, killing 25 to 30 Islamic militants.
22 January – The government of Togo establishes the Agence Nationale de l'Aviation Civile du Togo ("National Agency of Civil Aviation of Togo") as Togo's national civil aviation authority. It replaces the Direction de l’Aviation Civile ("Directorate of Civil Aviation").

February
21 February
Adam Air Flight 172, a Boeing 737-33A with 149 people on board, suffers a bent fuselage – the fuselage cracking in the center of the passenger cabin – when it makes hard landing at Juanda International Airport in Sidoarjo, Indonesia, near Surabaya. Some of those aboard suffer minor injuries, but there are no fatalities. Adam Air's other six Boeing 737s are grounded immediately.
The Lebanese Army fires at an Israeli Air Force unmanned aerial vehicle (UAV) flying over southern Lebanon south of Tyre, claiming it is violating both Lebanese sovereignty and the terms of the ceasefire that ended the 2006 Lebanon War. The UAV is not damaged. It is the first time that the Lebanese armed forces have fired at an Israeli aircraft since the end of the war in August 2006.

March
7 March – Garuda Indonesia Flight 200, a Boeing 737-497, crashes and bursts into flames on landing at Adisucipto International Airport at Yogyakarta on Java in Indonesia, killing 21 of the 140 people on board.
It catches fire, but lands at the airport without injury to anyone on board.
12 March – The first two Joint Fighter-17 aircraft are delivered to the Pakistan Air Force.
15 March – The Government of Argentina establishes the National Civil Aviation Administration as Argentina's national civil aviation authority. It replaces the Argentine Air Force in this role.
17 March – Landing at Samara Kurumoch Airport near Samara, Russia, in heavy fog, UTair Flight 471, a Tupolev Tu-134A3 with 57 people on board, touches down  short of the runway. The left wing separates and the aircraft bounces and flips over. Although no fire breaks out, the crash kills six and injuries 20 of the people on board.
23 March – Shortly after takeoff from Mogadishu International Airport in Mogadishu, Somalia, during the Battle of Mogadishu, a TransAVIAexport Airlines Ilyushin Il-76 cargo aircraft experiences an engine problem. While it attempts to return to the airport, one of its wings explodes, separates from the aircraft, and falls into the Indian Ocean. The aircraft crashes on the outskirts of Mogadishu, killing all 11 people on board. The Government of Somalia claims that the crash was an accident, while the Government of Belarus and at least one eyewitness say that a surface-to-air missile shot the Il-76 down.
27 March – The last Airbus A300 leaves the Airbus assembly line.

April
 1 April
Japan Airlines, J-Air, JAL Express, JALways, Japan Asia Airways, Japan Transocean Air, LAN Argentina, LAN Ecuador, Malév Hungarian Airlines, and Royal Jordanian join the Oneworld airline alliance. Although Aer Lingus exits the alliance on the same day, the additions expand the Oneworld network to almost 700 airports in nearly 150 countries served by 9,000 daily departures.
 The Government of Latvia's Aircraft Accident and Incident Investigation Bureau of the Republic of Latvia, the forerunner of the country's Transport Accident and Incident Investigation Bureau, takes on the responsibility for investigating railroad accidents and incidents.
 17 April – The airline go! begins operations, providing interisland service in Hawaii.
 21 April – During an air show at Marine Corps Air Station Beaufort, the pilot of an F/A-18 Hornet of the United States Navy (USN) Blue Angels flight demonstration squadron loses consciousness during a low-altitude, high-G maneuver. The F/A-18 crashes, killing him, striking homes and ground vehicles, and injuring eight people on the ground.
 27 April
An air-to-ground missile strike against the village of Saidgi in North Waziristan, Pakistan, near the border with Afghanistan kills four people. The United States and the North Atlantic Treaty Organization (NATO) both deny involvement.
A Russian military Mil Mi-8 helicopter carrying 15 special forces troops, two liaison officers, and a crew of three crashes in mountainous terrain near Shatoy in Chechnya, killing all 20 people on board. It is the Russian military's deadliest aviation accident since August 2002.
The Government of Portugal establishes the National Institute of Civil Aviation of Portugal (Instituto Nacional de Aviação Civil, I.P.) to serve as Portugal's national civil aviation authority. It replaces the National Institute of Civil Aviation (Instituto Nacional de Aviação Civil), which is abolished on this date.
 30 April
 The European Union and the United States sign the initial phase of the EU–US Open Skies Agreement at a ceremony in Washington, D.C. The agreement allows any airline of the EU and any airline of the US to fly between any point in the EU and any point in the US. It also allows airlines of the US to fly between points in the EU, and airlines of the EU to fly between the US and non-EU countries like Switzerland. The agreement is to become effective on 30 March 2008.

May
 During the month, the final assembly of the first Boeing 787 begins.
 2 May – Compass Airlines, a subcontractor regional airline for Northwest Airlines, begins flight operations with a single Bombardier CRJ200. The first flight is from Washington Dulles International Airport in Fairfax County, Virginia, to Minneapolis-Saint Paul International Airport in Hennepin County, Minnesota.
 5 May – Kenya Airways Flight 507, a Boeing 737-8AL bound for Nairobi, Kenya, crashes into a swamp just after takeoff from Douala International Airport outside Douala, Cameroon, killing all 114 people on board.
 6 May – A French Air Force DHC-6 Twin Otter plane operating in support of the Multinational Force and Observers (MFO) peacekeeping force along the border between Egypt and Israel attempts an emergency landing on a desert road on Egypt's Sinai Peninsula, collides with a truck, and is destroyed, killing all nine people on board.
 17 May – A Let L-410UVP Turbolet cargo aircraft suffers an engine fire just after takeoff from Walikale in the Democratic Republic of the Congo. While trying to return to the airstrip, it crashes in a forest, killing all three people on board.
 26 May - SkyWest Airlines (operating as United Express) Flight 5741, an Embraer EMB 120 Brasilia with 12 people on board, nearly collides with Republic Airlines (operating as Frontier Airlines) Flight 4912, an Embraer 170 Regional Jet with 15 people on board, at the intersection of two runways at San Francisco International Airport in South San Francisco, California. The U.S. Federal Aviation Administration describes it as the most serious incident of its kind in at least a decade.
 30 May – N898AT, one of only two remaining ATL-98 Carvairs, crashes at Nixon Fork Mine near McGrath, Alaska.

June
 1 June – A Tanzania People's Defence Force Short C-23 Sherpa develops dual engine failure on approach to land at Dodoma Airport in Dodoma, Tanzania, and crash-lands in the Kizota area of Dodoma. All 13 people aboard survive.
 3 June – A Paramount Airlines Mil Mi-8 helicopter carrying a Russian crew of two and 20 Togolese football fans returning from watching Togo's national team play that of Sierra Leone crashes near Lungi International Airport in Lungi, Sierra Leone. Togolese Minister of Sport Richard Attipoe is among the dead.
All aboard the plane die.
 19 June - An explosion near Mami Rogha in North Waziristan, Pakistan, just across the border from Afghanistan kills at least 20 people. Eyewitnesses claim to have seen an American unmanned aerial vehicle flying nearby over Afghanistan fire air-to-ground missiles at the site of the explosion, but the US and NATO deny involvement and Pakistans government claims that Islamic militants accidentally caused the explosion while building bombs.
 21 June – An overloaded Let L-410UVP Turbolet listed as operated by both Free Airlines and the supposedly defunct Karibu Airways crashes just after takeoff from Kamina Airport in Kamina, Democratic Republic of the Congo, and comes to rest inverted in a swamp. The crash kills Mbuyu Mibanga, a member of the National Assembly of the Democratic Republic of the Congo; the other 21 people on board survive, but 12 of them suffer injuries.
 24 June – During the Galway Air Show in Galway, Ireland, the door from a hovering Royal Air Force helicopter detaches and falls into a large crowd below, injuring three people on the ground.
 25 June – PMTair Flight 241, an Antonov An-24B, crashes in southwestern Cambodia, killing all 22 people on board. 
 28 June – A TAAG Angola Airlines Boeing 737-2M2 touches down short of the runway at Mbanza Congo Airport in Mbanza Congo, Angola. Its right landing gear collapses, and it collides with cars and strikes two buildings before coming to rest. The crash kills one person on the ground and five of the 78 people on board.
 29 June – Three rocket-propelled grenades strike the Fokker 100 carrying Prime Minister of the Ivory Coast Guillaume Soro just after it lands at Bouaké Airport in Bouake, Ivory Coast. One grenade penetrates the fuselage, killing four people and seriously injuring five others. Soro survives the attack.

July
 1 July – The Government of Latvia's Aircraft Accident and Incident Investigation Bureau of the Republic of Latvia is renamed the Transport Accident and Incident Investigation Bureau, reflecting its April assumption of the responsibility for investigating railroad accidents and incidents as well as aviation accidents.
 5 July
 A Cessna 208B Grand Caravan attempting a go-around after a mistaken attempt to land downwind at Connemara Airport in Inverin, Ireland, fails to gain altitude, strikes a mound with its left wing, cartwheels, and crashes. The crash kills the pilot and one passenger and injures the other seven people on board.
 A North American CT-39A Sabreliner cargo aircraft operated by Jett Paqueteria suffers a blown tire during takeoff at Bachigualato Federal International Airport in Culiacan, Mexico. The Sabreliner continues off the end of the runway and onto the Culiacán-Navolato highway, where it strikes several cars. The crash kills all three people on the aircraft and seven people on the ground.
 8 July – Boeing rolls out the Boeing 787 at the Boeing Everett Factory in Everett, Washington.
 17 July – TAM Linhas Aéreas Flight 3054, an Airbus A320-233, fails to slow down normally upon landing at São Paulo–Congonhas Airport in São Paulo, Brazil. It overruns the runway, crosses a road, crashes into a four-story TAM Express building, and explodes, starting a large fire. The deadliest aviation accident in Brazil's history, the crash kills all 187 people on the airliner and 12 people on the ground. 
 27 July – As five television news helicopters cover a police pursuit in Phoenix, Arizona, two of them – both Eurocopter AS350 AStar helicopters, one belonging to KNXV-TV and the other to KTVK, and each with two people on board – collide in mid-air above Steele Indian School Park and crash. All four people in the two helicopters die.
28 July – American aerobatic pilot Jim LeRoy is killed in the crash of his Pitts S2S Bulldog II during an aerobatic performance at the Dayton Air Show at Dayton International Airport outside Dayton, Ohio.

August
 7 August – A missile lands, but does not explode, in the Georgian-government-controlled village of Tsitelubani, Georgia. Authorities there claim that two Russian jets violated Georgian airspace and fired the missile at a nearby Georgian radar outpost, while Russian and South Ossetian authorities accuse Georgia of staging a false flag operation to provoke tension in the region. Two investigative groups from NATO countries report that the jet which fired the missile entered Georgian airspace from Russia, but Russia rejects this conclusion.
 8 August
Virgin America begins operations.
At Edwards Air Force Base, United States Secretary of the Air Force Michael W. Wynne announces the certification of B-52H Stratofortresses of the United States Air Force (USAF) to fly on a fuel made of a blend of conventional JP-8 jet fuel and Fischer–Tropsch fuel made from coal. The U.S. Air Force next plans to seek the same certification for its C-17 Globemaster III aircraft.
 9 August – Air Moorea Flight 1121, a DHC-6 Twin Otter, suddenly noses over shortly after taking off from Moorea Airport in French Polynesia and crashes into the Pacific Ocean, killing all 20 people on board.
 20 August – China Airlines Flight 120, a Boeing 737-809 with 165 people on board, catches fire after landing at Naha Airport on Okinawa, Japan. There are no fatalities; three people on the aircraft and one member of the ground crew are injured..
 20 August – Loch Lomond Seaplanes launches scheduled services from Glasgow Seaplane Terminal to Oban in Scotland.
 26 August – An Antonov An-32B owned by Agefreco Air and operated by the Great Lakes Business Company, carrying 12 passengers and a crew of three, crashes short of the runway while attempting to return to Kongolo Airport in the Democratic Republic of the Congo due to engine problems on takeoff. 14 of the occupants die.
 29–30 August
 A nuclear weapons incident occurs when six AGM-129 ACM cruise missiles, each loaded with a W80-1 variable yield nuclear warhead, are mistakenly loaded onto a USAF B-52H Stratofortress at Minot Air Force Base, North Dakota, on 29 August, and flown to Barksdale Air Force Base, Louisiana, on 30 August in violation of various mandatory security precautions for nuclear weapons. The incident has wide-ranging repercussions, including reforms in the handling procedures for nuclear weapons and the U.S. Air Force's creation in October 2008 of a Global Strike Command to control all USAF nuclear bombers, nuclear missiles, and nuclear-associated personnel.

September
1 September – Two Zlin Z-526 aircraft of the Polish Zelazny aerobatics team collide during a performance at the Radom Air Show in Radom, Poland, killing both pilots.
3 September – American aviation adventurer Steve Fossett disappears during a flight in a Bellanca Super Decathlon from the Flying-M Ranch near Smith Valley, Nevada.
13 September – In the "Celestial Eagle Remembrance Flight," USAF Captain Todd Pearson flies a Florida Air National Guard F-15A Eagle based at Homestead Air Reserve Base, Florida, on the 22nd anniversary of the "Celestial Eagle Flight," in which his father, retired U.S. Air Force Major General (then Major) Wilbert D. "Doug" Pearson, had flown the same F-15A for a test launch of the ASM-135 anti-satellite missile on 13 September 1985 in which he became the only person in history to destroy a satellite with an aircraft-launched missile.
15 September – Scottish rally driver Colin MacRae and his five-year-old son are among four people killed when the Eurocopter AS350 Écureuil he is piloting crashes near Lanark, Scotland.
16 September – One-Two-GO Airlines Flight 269, the McDonnell Douglas MD-82 HS-OMG carrying 123 passengers and 7 crew members, strikes an embankment adjacent to the runway while making a failed attempt to initiate a go-around at Phuket International Airport in Phuket, Thailand. It crashes and catches fire, killing 89 of the people on board.
21 September – Fifteen-year-old stowaway Andrey Shcherbakov survives a flight in Russia from Perm to Moscow inside a Boeing 737's wheel well, but suffers severe frostbite. 
24 September – A Free Airlines Let L-410 Turbolet carrying seven people crashes on landing in Malemba-Nkulu Territory, Democratic Republic of the Congo, coming to rest in a cemetery. Five of the people on board suffer serious injuries, and one of the pilots dies shortly afterward.

October
 4 October – An Antonov An-26 leased from Africa One, operated by El Sam Airlift, and chartered by Malift Air loses a propeller shortly after taking off from N'djili Airport in Kinshasa, Democratic Republic of the Congo. One of its wings strikes an obstacle and detaches before the aircraft crashes into a market and comes to rest in a house. The crash kills 20 people on the aircraft, leaving one or two survivors, and 31 people on the ground. At least 30 more people suffer injuries. The country's president, Joseph Kabila, fires its transport minister after the accident..
 15 October – Airbus delivers its first A380 superjumbo jet. Singapore Airlines takes delivery of it.
 26 October – Philippine Airlines Flight 475, an Airbus A320-214, overruns the runway on landing at Bancasi Airport in Butuan, the Philippines, and is destroyed when it plows into the tropical rainforest beyond the end of the runway. All 154 people on board survive.

November
 2 November
Air Asia X, a Malaysian low-cost, long-haul airline and sister company of AirAsia, begins flight operations. Its first flight is from Kuala Lumpur International Airport in Kuala Lumpur, Malaysia, to Gold Coast Airport in Australia.
An unmanned aerial vehicle fires missiles at a compound outside Miran Shah, North Waziristan, Pakistan, killing five Islamic militants and injuring six other people. The US denies involvement.
 15 November – Delegates to the World Radiocommunication Conference 2007 declare the United States Governments use of airplanes to beam the signals of Radio Martí and TV Martí into Cuba to be illegal, stating "A radio broadcasting station that functions on board an aircraft and transmits only to the territory of another administration without its agreement cannot be considered in conformity with the radio communications regulations." The United States nonetheless continues the broadcasts.
28 November – German aviatrix Elly Beinhorn dies aged 100.
30 November – Atlasjet Flight 4203, a McDonnell Douglas MD-83, crashes on a hill outside Keçiborlu, Turkey, and breaks into two pieces, killing all 57 people on board.

December
 Aer Lingus begins flight operations from Belfast International Airport in Northern Ireland, its first base outside the Republic of Ireland.
 12 December – Air China and Shanghai Airlines become the first major People's Republic of China airlines to join the Star Alliance.
 21 December – Comac rolls out the ACAC ARJ21 Advanced Regional Jet.
 30 December – A Boeing 737-300 operating on charter as TAROM Flight 3107 with 123 people on board, strikes a maintenance car on the runway while taking off in thick fog at Henri Coandă International Airport at Otopeni, Romania. The plane is written off, but there are no injuries or fatalities.

First flights

January
 23 January – Lockheed CATBird

February
 27 February – Bell 429 GlobalRanger

April
 14 April – Comp Air CA-12

June
 28 June – Rans S-19 Venterra
 29 June – Piasecki X-49

July
 6 July – Epic Victory
 14 July – Dornier S-Ray 007
 20 July – Boeing X-48
 26 July – Embraer Phenom 100 Executive Jet (in São José dos Campos, Brazil)

August
 3 August = Northrop Grumman E-2D Hawkeye
 23 August – Hawker 750

September
 13 September – Tecnam P2006T
 28 September – Kawasaki P-1

October
 26 October – Embraer Lineage 1000

December
 21 December – OMA SUD Skycar

Entered service 
 Sukhoi Su-30MKM with the Royal Malaysian Air Force

October 
25 October – The Airbus A380 with Singapore Airlines completed its first commercial flight, flying between Singapore and Sydney, Australia.

Retirements 

 25 October – The RQ-2 Pioneer by the United States Armed Forces; its last American operator is USN Composite Squadron 6 (VC-6))

References

 
Aviation by year